Kelliphite is an acronym for the organophosphorus compound 6,6'-[(1,1'-Biphenyl-2,2'-diyl)bis(oxy)]bis[4,8-di-tbutyl-1,2,10,11-tetramethyl]dibenzo[d,f][1,3,2]dioxaphosphepin. This chiral ligand is widely used in asymmetric synthesis. In one example, this ligand is used to form a rhodium complex to catalyze asymmetric hydroformylation of prochiral olefins. It has been shown that high substrate concentrations as well as a wide variety of functional groups are tolerated.

References

Organophosphites
Phenol ethers